The Port Hills Fault is an inferred active seismic fault believed to be located beneath the Port Hills near Christchurch, on the east coast of New Zealand's South Island.

Christchurch earthquake 

It followed nearly six months after the 7.1 magnitude 2010 Canterbury earthquake that caused significant damage to the region but no direct fatalities.

References

Seismic faults of New Zealand
2011 Christchurch earthquake
Buried rupture earthquakes